Rainbow Over the Rockies is a 1947 American Western film directed by Oliver Drake and written by Elmer Clifton. The film stars Jimmy Wakely, Lee White, Dennis Moore, Pat Starling, Jack Baxley and Budd Buster. The film was released on February 8, 1947 by Monogram Pictures.

Plot

Cast            
Jimmy Wakely as Jimmy Wakely
Lee White as 'Lasses' White
Dennis Moore as Bill Miller
Pat Starling as Ellen Miller
Jack Baxley as Charles Miller
Budd Buster as Frank Porter
Zon Murray as Dave Warren
Billy Dix as Henchman Nord
Jasper Palmer as Sheriff George Perry 
Carl Sepulveda as Slim
Bob Gilbert as Cowhand Shorty 
Wesley Tuttle as Porter Cowhand

References

External links
 

1947 films
American Western (genre) films
1947 Western (genre) films
Monogram Pictures films
Films directed by Oliver Drake
American black-and-white films
1940s English-language films
1940s American films